Ester Larsen (born 23 May 1936) is a Danish Venstre politician and schoolteacher who served as the Danish Minister of Health under the final two governments of Prime Minister Poul Schlüter from 1989 to 1993. She was a member of the Folketing as a representative of the  constituency between 1994 and 2005. Larsen was appointed Commander of the Order of the Dannebrog in 1990.

Early life
Larsen was born in Copenhagen on 23 May 1936, to the Chief Agronomist Inspector Laurs Sørensen Thøgersen and the nurse Laurs Sørensen Thøgersen. She graduated from Snoghøj Gymnastikhøjskole in 1952, and then earned qualifications in Mathematics and Science from Rysensteen Gymnasium three years later.

Career
From 1959 to 1963, she worked as a primary school teacher in Frederiksberg. Larsen was chair of the Viby School Board between 1966 and 1970 and served as chair of the Mesinge School Board from 1966 to 1978. She was the author of Reflekslys in 1967 and Pragtfulde dage in 1970. She graduated from Odense University with a Candidate of Philosophy in 1974. She also wrote three collections of Christmas stories between 1978 and 1980. Larsen was a member of the Board of Representatives of both the Danish Arts Foundation and the Danish Cultural Institute and was a bureau member of the Osteoporosis Association. Between 1982 and 1989, she was a member of the Kerteminde Museum's board, and the board of Odense Teater.

Larsen was elected as a member of the Kerteminde City Council for the Venstre political party in 1974 and she stood down from the council 15 years later. She was chair of the Education and Culture Committee of Kerteminde City Council between 1978 and 1986. Larsen stood on the Funen County Council from 1978 to 1989. Between 1986 and 1989, she was a board member of the County Council Association's board, the Health Insurance Negotiating Committee, the supervisory board of the Municipal Audit Department and the primary board of the Venstre political party. She was author of the book Digtning og Dansk in 1987, Jul på borgen four years later, and Familiekundskab – en levende bog om livet in 1994.

At the 1988 Danish general election, she unsuccessfully stood for election to represent the  constituency in the Folketing. Larsen also stood to represent the  constituency at the 1990 Danish general election and was again unsuccessful. She was appointed to the Minister of Health from 7 December 1989 and remained in the role until she resigned the ministership on 25 January 1993 during the final two government cabinets of Prime Minister Poul Schlüter. At the 1994 Danish general election on 21 September of that year, Larsen won election to the represent the  constituency in the Folketing. Larsen served a second term on the County Council Association's board from 1994 and on the supervisory board of the Municipal Audit Department from 1998 to 2005. She was the cultural spokesperson of Venstre from 2001 to 2005. Larsen left the Folketing at the 2005 Danish general election which was held on 8 February 2005.

Personal life
She has three children from her first marriage to the parish priest Kaj Jørgen L. from 5 July 1958 to their divorce in 1983. Larsen has been married to the consulting engineer Niels Erik Nielsen since 17 April 1994. In 1990, she was appointed Commander of the Order of the Dannebrog.

References

1936 births
Living people
Politicians from Copenhagen
University of Southern Denmark alumni
20th-century Danish educators
20th-century Danish women educators
20th-century Danish women politicians
20th-century Danish women writers
21st-century Danish women politicians
Members of the Folketing 1994–1998
Members of the Folketing 1998–2001
Members of the Folketing 2001–2005
Women members of the Folketing
Women government ministers of Denmark
Danish Health Ministers
Venstre (Denmark) politicians
Danish schoolteachers
Commanders of the Order of the Dannebrog